Eupithecia pimpinellata, the pimpinel pug, is a moth of the family Geometridae. The species was first described by Jacob Hübner in 1813. It is known from most of Europe to Morocco (High Atlas), Siberia, Kyrgyzstan, Altai, Mongolia.It primarily colonizes bushy places, forest edges, clearings, hedges, mountain slopes, embankments, railway dams and parks as well as semi-dry grasslands. In the Alps it rises to heights of 1800 metres.

The wingspan is 20–24 mm. Eupithecia pimpinellata has elongated wings. The forewing ground colour is ash-grey suffused rufous. The discal spot is large and elongated. Several crosslines, the median with a row of dark spots.Prout gives an account of the variations. There are forms of the long and slender larva which is either greenish with yellow segment incisions or are almost monochrome red.The brownish pupa has green or yellow wing sheaths. On the dark brown cremaster there are eight hook bristles, the middle pair of which is strongly formed.

There is one generation per year with adults on wing from the end of June to August.

The larvae mainly feed on Pimpinella saxifraga and Pimpinella major, but also other Apiaceae species. They feed on the flowers and seeds of their host plant. Larvae can be found from July to October. It overwinters as a pupa.

Subspecies
Eupithecia pimpinellata pimpinellata
Eupithecia pimpinellata retheli Prout, 1938
Eupithecia pimpinellata altaicata Guenée, [1858] Altai
Eupithecia pimpinellata vellicata Dietze, 1908 China

Similar species
Eupithecia distinctaria lacks the brown saddle on the second abdominal segment.
Eupithecia pauxillaria is a paler grey E. pimpinellata.

References

External links

Lepiforum e.V.

Moths described in 1813
pimpinellata
Moths of Europe
Moths of Africa
Moths of Asia
Taxa named by Jacob Hübner